M. carnea may refer to:

 Mammillaria carnea, a cactus with attractive flowers
 Marginella carnea, a margin shell
 Mitra carnea, a sea snail
 Myelois carnea, a snout moth
 Myriogramme carnea, a red algae